Mount Chivers is a mountain,  high, standing between the mouths of Otago Glacier and Tranter Glacier in the northern part of the Queen Elizabeth Range. It was mapped by the United States Geological Survey from tellurometer surveys and Navy air photos, 1960–62. It was named by the Advisory Committee on Antarctic Names for Hugh J.H. Chivers, United States Antarctic Research Program upper atmosphere physicist at Byrd Station, South Pole Station and Hallett Station, 1962–63.

References
 

Mountains of the Ross Dependency
Shackleton Coast